ACAC or acac may refer to:

 Acetylacetonate (acac), a ligand in coordination chemistry derived from acetylacetone
 ACAC consortium, a subsidiary of China Aviation Industry Corporation
 Alberta Colleges Athletics Conference, the governing body for collegiate sports in Alberta, Canada
 Amador County Arts Council, the official Amador County, US arts council
 Allen County Athletic Conference, High School conference in Indiana, US
 Atlanta Contemporary Art Center, a contemporary art museum in Atlanta